Seema Shinde is an Indian actress who predominantly works in Hindi and Marathi language media. She is best known for her roles in the television series Captain Vyom. She has also starred in films, including Justice Chowdhary, Main Madhuri Dixit Banna Chahti Hoon, and Aanch. She is a founder and Publisher of India2Usa Media E-Magazine.

Television

Filmography

Theater

Short Film By Films Division India

Television Advertisement

Music videos
 Dhagala lagli Kala Remix MTV India By DJ Akbar Sami

References

External links

 Seema Shinde on Instagram @Seemashinde

1975 births
Living people
Actresses from Mumbai
Indian film actresses
Indian television actresses
21st-century Indian actresses